A Corte do Norte is a 2009 Portuguese film directed by João Botelho.

Cast
 Ana Moreira

Reception
It was nominated for the 2010 Portuguese Golden Globe for Best Film.

References

External links
 

Portuguese romantic drama films
Films based on works by Agustina Bessa-Luís
Films directed by João Botelho